John Thomas Partridge (born 14 September 1962) is an English former professional footballer who played in the Football League for Chesterfield and Mansfield Town.

References

1962 births
Living people
English footballers
Association football defenders
English Football League players
Chesterfield F.C. players
Mansfield Town F.C. players
Alfreton Town F.C. players